Sto metrów miłości (One Hundred Metres of Love) is a 1932 Polish film directed by Michał Waszyński.

Cast
Zula Pogorzelska ...  Zośka 
Adolf Dymsza ...  Dodek 
Konrad Tom ...  Moniek vel Mieszek Oszczep-Sardinenfis 
Ludwik Lawiński ...  Rybkes 
Dora Kalinówna ...  Dora, Rybkes' sister 
Krystyna Ankwicz ...  Lili 
Mieczysław Cybulski ...  Jan Leski 
Franciszek Petersile ...  Janusz Pedałowicz 
Jerzy Kobusz   
Antoni Rózycki   
Stefania Betcherowa   
Eugeniusz Koszutski   
Marian Rentgen

External links 
 

1932 films
1930s Polish-language films
Polish black-and-white films
Films directed by Michał Waszyński
Polish romantic comedy films
Polish sports comedy films
1932 romantic comedy films
1930s sports comedy films